Interpassivity is a term from media studies that refers to the phenomenon whereby a piece of art or technology seems to act on the audience or user's behalf; it is the opposite of interactivity.

Origin of the term 
Pfaller picked up the term at a 1996 symposium in Linz, entitled Die Dinge lachen an unsere Stelle (trans: Things Laugh in our Place); in the same year he published an article entitled "Um die Ecke gelacht" (trans: Laughed Around the Corner) in Falter. These titles refer to one of Pfaller's core examples of interpassivity, canned laughter: the laugh track laughs in the audience's place.

Although Pfaller reinterpreted the term, he is openly indebted to a longer conceptual history. In his 1959-60 Seminar on The Ethics of Psychoanalysis, French psychoanalyst Jacques Lacan argued that, in Greek Tragedy, the Chorus feels (emotionally) in the audience's place; following this insight, in his 1989 book The Sublime Object of Ideology, Žižek argued that canned laughter is the exact modern counterpart to the Chorus. At this point, Žižek refers to the phenomenon as the "objective status of belief", in which the external object believes/feels/laughs on behalf of the subject, leaving the subject internally free from responsibility.

Meaning and examples
The book Interpassivity: The Aesthetics of Delegated Enjoyment by Robert Pfaller is the most authoritative source on the topic. Robert Pfaller has developed this theory since 1996, accounting for diverse cultural phenomena where delegation of consumption and enjoyment stands central, answering questions such as "Why do people record TV programmes instead of watching them?" "Why are some recovering alcoholics pleased to let other people drink in their place?" and "Why can ritual machines pray in place of believers?"

An example of interpassivity, given by Žižek, in his book How To Read Lacan, uses the VCR to illustrate the concept. The VCR records a movie (presumably to be watched later). However, Žižek argues that since the VCR can record, people who own them watch fewer movies because they can record them and have them on hand. The VCR does the watching of the movie so the owner of the VCR can be free not to watch the movie. Žižek uses the VCR to demonstrate the big other's role in interpassivity. The VCR, like canned laughter in a show, functions as a tool interacting with itself so the viewer can not watch the show.

Pfaller, a professor of philosophy at the University of Art and Design Linz elaborated the theory of interpassivity within the fields of cultural studies and psychoanalysis.. He has also received an award for the best 2014 book in psychoanalysis by the American Psychoanalytic Association, for his book On the Pleasure Principle in Culture: Illusions without Owners, which also includes a discussion of the concept of interpassivity. Juha Suoranta and Tere Vadén, working on the basis of Pfaller's and Zizek's insights, stress interpassivity's potential of changing "into its negative when illusory interactivity produces passivity".

References

External links
 Research paper on Interpassivity

Psychodynamics
Slavoj Žižek